The Battle of Caulk's Field was fought during the War of 1812 in Kent County, Maryland between a small British Army force commanded by Captain Sir Peter Parker and American militia forces commanded by Lieutenant Colonel Philip Reed.  Parker, who was operating in the Chesapeake Bay region as part of the British campaign against Baltimore, Maryland, landed on the eastern shore of the Chesapeake Bay to move against Reed's militia encampment.  The British attacking force encountered American skirmishers, who conducting a fighting retreat, drawing the British towards the main American line.  Parker was mortally wounded during the fight, and the British force withdrew after Parker fell.  Later British setbacks at the Battle of North Point and the Battle of Fort McHenry led the British to abandon their campaign against Baltimore.  In 2012, the battlefield was the site of an archaeological survey.

Background

In 1814, as part of the War of 1812, Major General Robert Ross of the British Army moved a force into the Chesapeake Bay.  Ross' subordinates, Vice Admirals Sir Alexander Cochrane and Sir George Cockburn of the Royal Navy, were in charge of naval actions in the Chesapeake Bay.  In late August, Captain Sir Peter Parker of the frigate  was sent in the direction of Baltimore, Maryland as a diversion with the intent of drawing American troops away from the Washington, D.C. area.  Parker's orders also included raiding the rural areas along the coast of the bay.  On August 24, British troops defeated an American force at the Battle of Bladensburg, which opened the path to Washington.  The British then burned the American capital.  After the destruction of Washington, the British then focused on attacking Baltimore.  Parker, who was still operating in the northern portion of the Chesapeake Bay, learned that American militia were encamped near Georgetown, Maryland on the eastern shore of the Chesapeake Bay.

Battle
Parker's force landed late on the night of August 30.  Sailors from the Royal Navy and men of the Royal Marines were represented in the British column.  The militiamen, of the 21st Regiment of Maryland Militia, were commanded by Lieutenant Colonel Philip Reed, who had fought in the American Revolution.  During the advance inland, guides, who may have been victims of impressment, misled the British column, allowing the Americans, who numbered about 200, to be better prepared for the British assault.  Parker's force encountered American skirmishers who were concealed behind the trees. The American skirmishers opened heavy fire from behind their trees. Then the American skirmishers quickly retreated to the main American line. The retreating skirmishers led the British towards American line, which included multiple cannons. The American militia were divided on the flanks, some of their riflemen placed in the woods, and their cavalry placed in the rear. The battle took place at night, and the light of a full moon exposed the British soldiers during their advance, allowing the Americans to open heavy accurate fire with their cannons, muskets, and rifles thus inflicting several casualties.  The Americans held the high ground, giving the defenders an advantage.  British Lieutenant Henry Crease reported that one portion of the British attacking force was briefly able to gain a foothold in the main American position on the high ground, at one point taking one of the American cannons. The Americans cautiously retreated towards near the woods before halting to make another stand opening fire.  The Americans eventually began to run out of ammunition and retreated to regroup and redistribute ammunition. But Parker was then wounded in the thigh and bled to death.  The British fell back after Parker's death.  American casualties totaled three wounded.  British casualties are reported at 41.

Aftermath
While the outcome of the fight increased American morale, it did not discourage the British from pressing their assault on Baltimore.  On September 12, Ross' infantry force won a tactical victory over an American force at the Battle of North Point.  Ross was mortally wounded during the fighting, and the British advance was slowed.  The naval prong of the British assault on Baltimore was blunted when the naval bombardment of Fort McHenry, which occurred on September 13 and 14, failed to accomplish substantial results.  The British infantry force, now commanded by Colonel Arthur Brooke, withdrew early on the morning of the 14th, and the naval force withdrew after the failure of the bombardment of Fort McHenry and the failure of an attempted amphibious assault, ending the assault on Baltimore.

A historic marker, erected in 1902, marks the location of the battle.

Archaeological survey
In March 2012, an archaeological team from the Maryland State Highway Administration and the University of Maryland began an archaeological survey of the battlefield, which is considered to be one of the best-preserved War of 1812 sites in Maryland.  The survey used metal detectors to locate artifacts, and discovered 721 items in the area of the battle site.  However, many of the items postdated the fight.  Some of the items related to the battle that were discovered included musket balls, cannon ammunition, and firearm parts.  The caliber of the standard small arms used by the two sides was different, which allowed the musket balls to be identified as having been fired by either the British or the Americans.  The finds were interpreted as corroborating the historic accounts of the fighting in some aspects: the artifact patterning placed the American line on the high ground and was consistent with the accounts of American skirmishers conducting a fighting retreat towards the main American line.  An unfired British musket ball was found near where the American artillery position is believed to have been, which may support Crease's statement about the temporary capture of an American cannon.  Additionally, the archaeological finds suggest that the battle was fought over a larger area than was previously thought.

Notes

References

Sources

Further reading
 
 
 
 

Caulk's Field
Caulk's Field
1814 in Maryland
Kent County, Maryland
Caulk's Field
Caulk's Field
August 1814 events